The Baseball Finnish Championship Series (Finnish: Baseballin SM-sarja) has been played in Finland since 1981. Currently the Championship consists of 6 teams, but has had as many as 7 (in 2007). The Championship winner represents Finland in the following year's CEB European Cup tournament.

History 
The first year of the Finnish Championship Series was 1981, in which the championship was won by the Hawks from Helsinki. The Hawks merged with Helsingin Pallotoverit and the team won under the name Wranglers also in 1982. After the 1982 season the team changed its name to Puumat (Pumas) and has been one of the most successful clubs and the only club to remain from the 1980s; and still plays currently.
Due to the recession, the 1992 season was not played, and the history of baseball can be divided between pre-1992 and post 1992.

The only team outside the Helsinki Metropolitan Area to win the Finnish Championship was Riihimäen Piraijat (Riihimäki Piranhas) in 1994.

League format 
The season starts in early May, and is completed by the end of August or early September. Currently there are 4 teams in the top league. Each team in the Finnish Championship Series plays 15 games; teams play against each other 5 times. The top 2 teams meet in the Best-of-Five Championship Series.

Current Teams
 Espoo Expos
 Helsinki Mets
 Helsinki Puumat
 Lahti Pirates
 Tampere Tigers
 Kiili Pantrid (Estonia)

Champions 
 1981 Helsinki Hawks (Puumat)
 1982 Helsinki Wranglers (Puumat)
 1983 Helsinki Puumat
 1984 Helsinki Puumat
 1985 Helsinki Kintaro
 1986 Espoo Baseball Softball Club (EBSC)
 1987 Helsinki Puumat
 1988 Helsinki Devils
 1989 Helsinki Devils
 1990 Helsinki Devils
 1991 Helsinki Puumat
 1992 (not played)
 1993 Helsinki Puumat
 1994 Riihimäki Pirajat
 1995 Helsinki Puumat
 1996 Espoo Athletics
 1997 Espoo Athletics
 1998 Espoo Athletics
 1999 Helsinki Puumat
 2000 Espoo Athletics
 2001 Espoo Athletics
 2002 Helsinki Icebreakers
 2003 Espoo Expos
 2004 Espoo Expos
 2005 Espoo Expos
 2006 Espoo Expos
 2007 Espoo Expos
 2008 Espoo Expos
 2009 Espoo Expos
 2010 Espoo Expos
 2011 Espoo Expos
 2012 Espoo Expos
 2013 Espoo Expos
 2014 Espoo Expos
 2015 Espoo Expos
 2016 Espoo Expos
 2017 Espoo Expos
 2018 Helsinki Mets
 2019 Espoo Expos
 2020 Espoo Expos
 2021 Tampere Tigers
 2022 Espoo Expos

Championships won by team 

18 Espoo Expos
9 Helsinki Puumat (Hawks/Wranglers)
5 Espoo Athletics
3 Helsinki Devils
1 Helsinki Kintaro
1 Espoo Baseball Softball Club (EBSC)
1 Riihimäki Piraijat
1 Helsinki Icebreakers
1 Helsinki Mets
1 Tampere Tigers

References

External links 
Suomen Baseball- ja Softball-liitto
Espoo Expos
 Helsinki Puumat
Malmi Bullets
Tampere Tigers

Baseball in Finland
Recurring sporting events established in 1981
Baseball
Finland
1981 establishments in Finland